"The Creeps" is a song by London-based electronic dance music band Freaks. The original version, titled "The Creeps (You're Giving Me)", appeared on Freaks' 2003 album, The Man Who Lived Underground. A set of remixes reached number 97 on the UK Singles Chart in December 2004. In 2006, it was remixed by Australian duo Vandalism; their remix became a club hit and "the biggest download in [dance music retailer] djdownload.com's history".

Following a bidding war, the song was signed to Ministry of Sound in 2007, and a new version titled "The Creeps (Get on the Dancefloor)" was produced, combining the Vandalism remix with a new vocal by Freaks member Stella Attar. This version went on to reach number nine on the UK Singles Chart in September 2007 and also charted internationally.

Music video
The music video shows a male security guard who works in a mortuary. As he patrols the mortuary, three female corpses with vampyric elongated canines come to life and chase him through the facility. He is cornered at a locked door, but as they attack the scene changes to leave him on his own. He returns to the security centre to watch the CCTV replay where he sees the truth. The three girls were real, and are shown sensually attacking him with their canines.

Track listings

 2003 12-inch single
 "The Creeps (You're Giving Me)" (Original)
 "The Creeps (You're Giving Me)" (Steve Bug Remix)

 2004 UK 12-inch remixes single
 "The Creeps (You're Giving Me)" (Steve Bug Remix)
 "The Creeps (You're Giving Me)" (Justin Robertson Remix)

 2006 UK 12-inch "unreleased remixes" single
 "The Creeps (You're Giving Me)" (Vandalism Remix)
 "The Creeps (You're Giving Me)" (Lee Coombs Remix)

 2007 UK 2-track CD single
 "The Creeps (Get on the Dancefloor)" (Radio Edit)
 "The Creeps (Get on the Dancefloor)" (Vandalism Remix)

 2007 UK 6-track CD single
 "The Creeps (Get on the Dancefloor)" (Radio Edit)
 "The Creeps (Get on the Dancefloor)" (Vandalism Vocal Mix)
 "The Creeps (Get on the Dancefloor)" (Thomas Gold Vocal Remix)
 "The Creeps (Get on the Dancefloor)" (Thomas Gold Remix)
 "The Creeps (Get on the Dancefloor)" (Micky Slim Remix)
 "The Creeps (Get on the Dancefloor)" (Micky Slim Dub Mix)

 2007 UK 12-inch single
 "The Creeps (Get on the Dancefloor)" (Vandalism Vocal Mix)
 "The Creeps (Get on the Dancefloor)" (Vandalism Remix)
 "The Creeps (Get on the Dancefloor)" (Micky Slim Remix)
 "The Creeps (Get on the Dancefloor)" (Thomas Gold Vocal Remix)

Charts

Weekly charts

Original version

Original version (remixes)

Vandalism remix

"The Creeps (Get on the Dancefloor)"

Year-end charts

Release history

References

2007 singles
2007 songs
Data Records singles